Presidential elections were held in Benin on 6 March 2016, having been delayed by one week due to logistical constraints. Incumbent President Thomas Boni Yayi was at the end of his second presidential term and was constitutionally barred from running for a third. The elections grabbed the interest of many of the country's top businessmen, resulting in over 30 candidates trying to run for the presidency. A second round was held on 20 March, in which businessman Patrice Talon defeated Prime Minister Lionel Zinsou.

Background
During 2015 and 2016 the leaders of some African countries undertook efforts to remain in power after decades of rule; a referendum in Rwanda resulted in Paul Kagame being allowed to remain in power, there was unrest in Burundi over President Pierre Nkurunziza's plans to run for a third term, whilst the long-term presidents of Uganda and the Republic of the Congo ran for office again. However, in West Africa, the long-term president of Burkina Faso was removed from office and Nigerian President Goodluck Jonathan left office after losing an election.

The body charged with producing the new voter cards failed to live up to their deadlines of distributing cards. This caused the Constitutional Court to first delay the elections by a week, and then make the ruling that old voter cards issued prior to the 2011 elections would also be accepted as the court feared that voters might be disenfranchised.

Campaign
Campaigning was only permitted for a 15-day period directly before the elections. The Constitutional Court sanctioned a campaign period from 19 February to 4 March 2016.

Candidates
The Résoatao Party selected its candidate via party primaries held on 7 November 2015; its leader and sole MP Mohamed Atao Hinnouho was chosen with 141 votes, with the president of the party's women's branch Eliane Saizonou receiving 14 votes and the party's first councillor Félix Tohoyessou eight.

Prime Minister Lionel Zinsou announced on 1 December 2015 that he would stand as the candidate of the Cowry Forces for an Emerging Benin, the party of President Yayi Boni, in the 2016 presidential election. He said that he would focus on financing agriculture and helping informal workers obtain formal employment. Zinsou's French background attracted some criticism. At a meeting of a grouping of Zinsou's opponents held on 5 January 2016, a trade union leader denounced Zinsou as "a colonizer" who was "parachuted in ... to safeguard the economic crimes of Boni Yayi". The government defended Zinsou, stressing that he was "a full citizen of Benin" and that arguing that his opponents were appealing to "base instincts of hatred, racism, fear and intolerance."

The Democratic Renewal Party, the third party in parliament led by Adrien Houngbédji, announced on 30 January 2016 that it would support Lionel Zinsou. Independent candidates included the businessmen Patrice Talon and Sebastien Adjavon.

The Autonomous National Electoral Commission (CENA) announced on 13 January 2016 that 48 people had filed the necessary paperwork to stand as presidential candidates, although their candidacies still needed to be approved by the Constitutional Court. Each candidate had to submit health certificates that prove a clean bill of health and deposit a filing fee of an equivalent $25,000. The court cleared 36 candidates and dropped 11 candidates for not providing sufficient evidence for various standard requirements. Three further candidates dropped from the race prior to the allocated campaigning period.

Results
Provisional results released on 8 March 2016 showed Lionel Zinsou placing first with 28.4% of the vote. Patrice Talon placed second with 24.8% and Sebastien Ajavon placed third with 23.03%. Zinsou was therefore expected to face Talon in a second round of voting.

For the second round, Talon received the support of 24 out of 32 of the defeated first round candidates. Most notably, he received the backing of Ajavon. The second round was held on 20 March 2016. Saying that the results "point to a decisive victory for Patrice Talon", Zinsou quickly conceded defeat and congratulated Talon.

The Constitutional Court validated the results on 25 March.

Aftermath
Speaking on the same day that the Constitutional Court confirmed the results, Talon said that he would "first and foremost tackle constitutional reform", discussing his plan to limit presidents to a single term of five years in order to combat "complacency". He also said that he planned to slash the size of the government from 28 to 16 members. He was sworn in on 6 April 2016, and the composition of his government was announced later in the day. There was no prime minister, and two defeated presidential candidates who had backed Talon in the second round, Pascal Koupaki and Abdoulaye Bio-Tchane, were appointed to key posts: Koupaki as Secretary-General of the Presidency and Bio-Tchane as Minister of State for Planning and Development.

References

Presidential elections in Benin
Benin
2016 in Benin
March 2016 events in Africa